Bəhmətli (known as Verxiyan until 1992) is a village and municipality in the Zaqatala Rayon of Azerbaijan.  It has a population of 4,273.  The municipality consists of the villages of Bəhmətli and Kürdəmir.

Notable natives 

 Faig Amirov — National Hero of Azerbaijan.

References

External links

Populated places in Zaqatala District